The accession of Croatia to NATO took place in 2009. The country entered into Partnership for Peace in 2000, which began the process of accession into the alliance. It received an invitation to join at the 2008 Bucharest summit and became a full member on April 1, 2009.

History

Croatia's first relations with NATO were established in 1953. That year Yugoslavia entered into the Balkan Pact, a loose military alliance with Greece and Turkey, then both recent NATO members.

Croatia had considered holding a referendum on NATO membership. On March 23, 2007, the Croatian president Stjepan Mesić, Prime Minister Ivo Sanader and President of parliament Vladimir Šeks declared that the Croatian constitution does not require a referendum on this issue. In 2006 the Croatian government was planning to start a media campaign to promote the benefits of membership. In February 2008 a project named Bolje pakt nego rat was formed by Transparency International Croatia and iDEMO, and financed by the United States embassy in Croatia, in order to promote the NATO membership through public discussions about its benefits.

A May 2007 poll commissioned by the government showed that NATO membership was backed by 52% of the population, and 25% was against. On January 4, 2008, Croatian Prime minister Ivo Sanader reached a coalition agreement with partners from HSS and HSLS to form a new government. According to a provision of the said agreement Croatia's entry into NATO would not be decided on a referendum. Less than 20 days before entering NATO, Prime Minister Sanader stated: "I will forget that some people had requested a referendum. Had we started that adventure, we wouldn't have accomplished this."

Croatia has been a member of the International Security Assistance Force in Afghanistan since December 12, 2002. In 2003 Croatia joined the Adriatic Charter along with other NATO aspirants. In November, 2006 the State Committee for the Membership of Croatia in NATO was established, with Croatian president Stjepan Mesić serving as committee president, and speaker Vladimir Šeks and prime minister Ivo Sanader serving as its vice-presidents. In June, 2007 the Croatian Parliament and the NATO parliamentary Assembly held a three-day conference in Dubrovnik entitled "Southeast Europe: Unfinished business", to discuss security and political issues in the region. The Noble Midas 07 NATO exercise held in Croatia in October, 2007 was the first time in the alliance's history that it held a military exercise in a non-member country. Croatia hosted an unofficial meeting of defense ministers on NATO's role in southeastern Europe in March, 2009.

On January 1, 2008 Croatia abandoned military conscription and finished its transition to a fully professional army. The Armed Forces of the Republic of Croatia expects that it will join the NATO-led Kosovo Force (KFOR) in 2009. With Croatia's accession to the alliance, it has become more likely that the country will leave the Non-Aligned Movement. The Croatian minister of foreign affairs Gordan Jandroković was invited to the movement's 15th Conference, held in Iran in July, 2008. Instead of a high-level delegate, the Croatian ambassador to Iran, Esad Prohić, served as Croatian representative.

Negotiation progress

See also
 Foreign relations of Croatia
 2013 enlargement of the European Union
 Accession of Albania to NATO

References

External links
Croatian mission to NATO

NATO relations
Foreign relations of Croatia
Croatia and NATO
Modern history of Croatia